Tsui Ping Estate is a public housing estate in Kwun Tong, Kowloon, Hong Kong. It is divided into Tsui Ping (South) Estate and Tsui Ping (North) Estate. After redevelopment, the estate has a total of 19 blocks built in the 1980s and 1990s.

Background 
Tsui Ping Estate was formerly a resettlement estate, Kwun Tong Resettlement Estate, commonly known as Kai Liu, which was built in the 1960s. It was the first resettlement estate in Kwun Tong District. The residents were mainly Chaozhou people. There were no kitchens or washrooms inside the flats. The roof was commonly used as school classrooms and community activities area. In 1972 the estate was inundated with mud from a nearby landslide that killed 71. The site of the disaster is commemorated by the Sau Mau Ping Memorial Park.

In 1973, to avoid the confusion with another estate, Kwun Tong Estate, Kwun Tong Resettlement Estate was renamed as Kwun Tong (Tsui Ping Road) Estate. The estate was renamed as Tsui Ping Estate after it was redeveloped between the 1980s and 1990s. In 2002, some of the flats in Tsui Ping (North) Estate (Tsui Mei House excluded) were sold to tenants through Tenants Purchase Scheme Phase 5.

Features

A Tai Wong Ye Temple is located on the hill behind Tsui Ying House of Tsui Ping (South) Estate. The origin of the temple was a shrine located in present-day Lok Fu. It was relocated to make space for the building of the Lo Fu Ngam Resettlement Area in 1957. The new site was dedicated in 1963.

Houses

Tsui Ping (South) Estate

Tsui Ping (North) Estate

Buildings and public facilities nearby 
 Community services facilities
Hong Kong Public Records Building
Kwun Tong Community Centre
Kwun Tong Swimming Pool
 Schools
Our Lady Of China Catholic Primary School
IVE Kwun Tong Campus
SKH Leung Kwai Yee Secondary School
The Mission Convent Church Holm Glad College
CCC Mong Man Wai College
 Public housing estates
Wo Lok Estate
Po Pui Court

Education
Tsui Ping Estate is in Primary One Admission (POA) School Net 48. Within the school net are multiple aided schools (operated independently but funded with government money) and Kwun Tong Government Primary School.

References 

Kwun Tong
Public housing estates in Hong Kong
Tenants Purchase Scheme